German submarine U-3501 was a Type XXI U-boat (one of the "Elektroboote") of Nazi Germany's Kriegsmarine, built for service in World War II. She was ordered on 6 November 1943, and was laid down on 20 March 1944 at F Schichau GmbH, Danzig, as yard number 1646. She was launched on 19 April 1944, and commissioned under the command of Oberleutnant zur See Helmut Münster on 29 July 1944.

Design
Like all Type XXI U-boats, U-3501 had a displacement of  when at the surface and  while submerged. The submarine was powered by two MAN SE supercharged six-cylinder M6V40/46KBB diesel engines each providing , two Siemens-Schuckert GU365/30 double-acting electric motors each providing , and two Siemens-Schuckert silent running GV232/28 electric motors each providing .

U-3501 was fitted with six  torpedo tubes in the bow and four  C/30 anti-aircraft guns. She could carry twenty-three torpedoes or seventeen torpedoes and twelve mines. The complement was five officers and fifty-two men.

Fate
U-3501 was scuttled on either 1 or 5 May 1945 in the Weser estuary, near Nordenham, as part of Operation Regenbogen. The wreck was later raised and broken up.

References

Bibliography

External links
 

Type XXI submarines
U-boats commissioned in 1944
World War II submarines of Germany
1944 ships
Ships built in Danzig
Operation Regenbogen (U-boat)
Ships built by Schichau
Maritime incidents in May 1945